Tetragonoderus simplex is a species of beetle in the family Carabidae. It was described by Henry Walter Bates in 1883.

References

Beetles described in 1883
simplex